The Table of the Poor (Italian: La tavola dei poveri) is a 1932 Italian drama film directed by Alessandro Blasetti and starring Raffaele Viviani, Leda Gloria and Salvatore Costa. It was based on a play by Viviani set in Naples. It was shot at the Cines Studios in Rome. The film's sets were designed by Gastone Medin. It portrays the adventures of an impoverished Marquis who continues to lead a grand lifestyle.

Main cast
 Raffaele Viviani as Marquis Isidoro Fusaro 
 Leda Gloria as Giorgina Fusaro 
 Salvatore Costa as Biase 
 Marcello Spada as Nello Valmadonna 
 Mario Ferrari as Attorney Volterra 
 Vincenzo Flocco as Mezzapalla 
 Armida Cozzolino as Lida Valmadonna 
 Lina Bacci as The secretary 
 Cesare Zoppetti as The teacher 
 Vasco Creti as The waiter 
 Idolo Tancredi as Il creditore delle camicie stirate 
 Gennaro Pisano as Il commissario

References

Bibliography 
 Landy, Marcia. The Folklore of Consensus: Theatricality in the Italian Cinema, 1930-1943. SUNY Press, 1998. 
 Mancini, Elaine. Struggles of the Italian Film Industry during Fascism. UMI Research Press, 1985.
 Moliterno, Gino. Historical Dictionary of Italian Cinema. Scarecrow Press, 2008.

External links 
 

1932 films
Italian drama films
Italian black-and-white films
1932 drama films
1930s Italian-language films
Films directed by Alessandro Blasetti
Films set in Naples
Italian films based on plays
Cines Studios films
1930s Italian films